The New Yogi Bear Show (also known as Hanna-Barbera's Yogi Bear Show) is an American animated television series and the sixth incarnation of the Yogi Bear franchise produced by Hanna-Barbera Productions that aired in syndication from September 12 to November 11, 1988, containing forty-five new episodes combined with reruns of the 1961 series. Pared down from some of the other versions (the all-star cartoons with Huckleberry Hound, Quick Draw McGraw and others), this series featured only Yogi, Boo-Boo, Cindy and Ranger Smith, with episodes set in Jellystone Park.

New characters were introduced for the series, such as, Ranger Roubideux (Ranger Smith's assistant who is chubby and tiny-sized), Ninja Raccoon (a Japanese raccoon cub who wears a kimono), and Yogi's father. The series marked the debut of Greg Burson as the voice of Yogi following Daws Butler's death on May 18, 1988, four months prior to the series' debut.

Episodes

Cast
 Greg Burson - Yogi Bear
 Don Messick - Boo-Boo Bear, Ranger Smith
 Julie Bennett - Cindy Bear
 Peter Cullen - Ranger Roubideux
 Frank Welker - Ninja Raccoon, Cruise Director (in "Cruise Bruise"), Slone Malone (in "Double Trouble"), Predaterminator (in "Predaterminator")

Additional voices
 David Ackroyd - 
 Charlie Adler - Director Sammy Baby (in "Shine on Silver Screen"), Buffalo Billy (in "Buffalo'd Bear")
 Patricia Alice Albrecht - Minska Bruinovitch (in "The Big Bear Ballet")
 George Ball - 
 Susan Blu - Little Yog (in "Bringing Up Yogi")
 William Callaway - 
 Richard Erdman - 
 Chad Everett - 
 Laurie Faso - Film Director (in "Double Trouble")
 Miriam Flynn - Mom with yellow top (in "Old Biter")
 Pat Fraley - Yippee Wolf (in "The Not So Great Escape")
 Lauri Fraser - Bibi the Biker (in "Biker Bear")
 Teresa Ganzel - Hambo's Girl (in "Double Trouble")
 Kathy Garver - 
 Dick Gautier - 
 Arlene Golonka - 
 Dana Hill - Tim (in "Little Lord Boo Boo")
 Peter Leeds - 
 Allan Lurie - 
 Tress MacNeille - Blonde Mom and Brunette Mom (in "Old Bitter")
 Laurie Main - 
 Allan Melvin - Growler Bear (in "Real Bears Don't Eat Quiche")
 Scott Menville - Cody (in "Pokey the Bear")
 Howard Morris - Principal Pinecone (in "Bear Obedience")
 Alan Oppenheimer - Yogi's Pop (in "Boxcar Pop")
 Rob Paulsen - Bamba Bear (in "La Bamba Bear")
 Henry Polic II - Corky Carny (in "Come Back, Little Boo Boo")
 Jan Rabson - 
 Hal Smith -
 John Stephenson - The Great Shadrak (in "Shadrak Yogi")
 Cree Summer - Scruffy (in "Pokey the Bear")
 B.J. Ward - Buttercup Bear and Brunhilda Bear (in "Yogi de Beargerac")
 Patric Zimmerman -

Home media

VHS release
In 2000, Warner Home Video included this "Attack of the Ninja Raccoon", "Biker Bear", "In Search of the Ninja Raccoon", "Balloonatics", "Board Silly", and "Kahuna Yogi" on its VHS Bumper Collection in Australia.

DVD release
No plans have been made yet for a U.S. release.

See also
 List of works produced by Hanna-Barbera Productions
 List of Hanna-Barbera characters
 Yogi Bear (character)
 The Yogi Bear Show
 Yogi's Gang
 Yogi's Treasure Hunt
 Yo Yogi!

References

External links
 The New Yogi Bear Show @ The Big Cartoon DataBase
 
 

Yogi Bear television series
1988 American television series debuts
1988 American television series endings
1980s American animated television series
American children's animated comedy television series
The Funtastic World of Hanna-Barbera
First-run syndicated television programs in the United States
Television series by Hanna-Barbera
American animated television spin-offs
Animated television series about bears